Murau is a town in the western part of the Austrian federal state of Styria. It is the administrative seat of Murau District.

Geography
The historic town is located in mountainous Upper Styria in the valley of the Mur river between the Lower Tauern range and the Gurktal Alps. The municipal area comprises the cadastral communities of Laßnitz-Lambrecht, Murau proper and Sankt Egidi, as well as the former independent municipalities of Laßnitz bei Murau, Stolzalpe and Triebendorf which were incorporated in the course of a 2015 administrative reform. Murau currently has a population of 3,688.

The town's economy largely depends on tourism, especially in the nearby Kreischberg ski resort. It is also known for its brewing tradition (Murauer Bier) documented since the 15th century. Murau station is a stop on the narrow-gauge Mur Valley Railway (Murtalbahn), running along the Mur river from Unzmarkt up to Mauterndorf in Salzburg.

History
The area was already settled in the Bronze Age through the Roman Era. Based on an entry in the Tabula Peutingeriana the ancient city of Noreia, capital of the Celtic kingdom Noricum, was thought to be near Murau in the late 18th and the 19th century. However, no archaeological evidence has been found so far.

Murowe itself, centre of the Styrian estates in the Mur valley held by the noble Liechtenstein family, was first mentioned in a 1250 deed. The famous minnesinger Ulrich von Liechtenstein (d. 1275) from nearby Frauenburg had a castle erected at Murau which was again demolished when the Bohemian king Ottokar II occupied the Styrian lands upon his victory at Kressenbrunn in 1260. Ulrich had to cede his estates to the king and was temporarily arrested in Moravia.

The Liechtenstein estates were restored, when Ottokar was defeated in the 1278 Battle on the Marchfeld. Ulrich's son Otto had the Gothic parish church of St Matthew's with its characteristic crossing tower built from 1284, it was consecrated by the Lavant bishop in 1296. The Murau citizens were vested with town privileges in 1298, whereafter the town was fortified and significantly enlarged.

From 1480 to 1490, the town was occupied by the Hungarian forces of King Matthias Corvinus. The Liechtensteins held Murau until the late 16th century. From 1623 onwards, it was a possession of the House of Schwarzenberg who had Murau Castle rebuilt in its present Renaissance style. The present owner is Karel Schwarzenberg.

During World War II a camp of the Wehrmacht armed forces was located here, in which captured British prisoners of war were held enthralled. At the end of the war in May 1945, local groups of resistance fighters freed eight remaining POWs and successfully led the approaching Red Army forces to believe that the town was already occupied by the British.

Population

Events 

The Murtalbahn steam train is a historic part of the town, as well as one of its tourist attractions. Murau is also known for its annual Samson parades on August 15.

Since 2002, the annual festival Shakespeare in Styria presents productions of Shakespeare plays in the town's Festival Hall, in the Courtyard of the Murau Castle as well as at the Domenig Pavillon in the park of the town. The festival was founded in 2002 by British born theatre manager Nicholas Allen and Austrian writer Rudolph J. Wojta. Each year it presents another play performed by young actors and actresses from all over Europe directed by experienced British directors. In the early years of the festivals performances were in English. Since 2013 productions are performed in German and directed by Nicholas Allen and US-American sword-master Roberta Brown. Since the summer of 2016, the festival has been based at St. Lambrecht Abbey, some 14 kilometres from Murau and no performance have taken place in Murau.

Politics

Seats in the town's assembly (Stadtrat) as of 2015 local elections:
Austrian People's Party (ÖVP): 15
Social Democratic Party of Austria (SPÖ): 3
Forum für Murau (Independent): 1
The Greens – The Green Alternative: 1

Twin towns — sister cities

Murau is twinned with:
 Fagagna, Italy

Notable people
 Willi Egger (1932–2008), Nordic combined skier
 Brunner & Brunner (born 1955 and 1958 resp.), pop duo
 Klaus Ofner (born 1968), Nordic combined skier

References

External links
 murau.steiermark.at (German)

Cities and towns in Murau District